In Limbo is a 2021 Russian crime drama film directed by Aleksandr Khant. This film was theatrically released on June 23, 2022.

Plot 
The film is about a young couple who run away from home and decide to take on the cruel adult world, unaware that their innocent prank will turn into a real crime.

Cast 
 Igor Ivanov as Sasha Makarova
 Zhenya Vinogradova as Danila Krasnov
 Olga Sakhanova as Irina
 Zhanna Pugachyova as Snezhana
 Konstantin Gatsalov as Viktor
 Vladimir Spartak
 Ilya Mozgovoy as cyclist
 Konstantin Itunin as Viktor's assistant
 Irina Cherichenko as Olga Romanova
 Denis Kurlayev as police officer

References

External links 
 

2021 films
2020s Russian-language films
Russian crime drama films
2021 crime drama films